Pavlovsky (masculine), Pavlovskaya (feminine),  or Pavlovskoye (neuter) may refer to:

Pavlovsky (surname)

Places
Pavlovsky District, several districts in Russia
Pavlovskoye Urban Settlement, several municipal urban settlements in Russia
Pavlovsky (inhabited locality) (Pavlovskaya, Pavlovskoye), several inhabited localities in Russia
Pavlovskaya, name of Kodiak, Alaska when it was founded in 1791 in Russian America

Other
Pavlovskoye Reservoir, a reservoir in the Republic of Bashkortostan, Russia

See also
 Pavel
 Pavlov (disambiguation)
 Pavlovka (disambiguation)
 Pavlovsk (disambiguation)
 Pavlovo